Aviation refers to powered flight.

Aviation may also refer to:

Aviation (album), a 2014 album by Semi Precious Weapons, or the title song
Aviation, a 1976 instrumental album by R. Stevie Moore
Aviation, a 2000 album by The Red Telephone
"Aviation" (song), a song by The Last Shadow Puppets
"Aviation", a song by Leo Sayer from the 1984 album Have You Ever Been in Love
Aviation (painting), a 1934 painting by Rufino Tamayo
Aviation (cocktail), a classic cocktail
Aviation Week & Space Technology, a weekly magazine, called Aviation from 1922 to 1947